The 1938–39 season was Stoke City's 39th season in the Football League and the 25th in the First Division. It was the final full season of league football until 1946 due to World War II.

Stoke again made no major signings despite a very disappointing campaign last season. After a poor start Stoke began to play well during the season and finished in a respectable 7th place having collected 46 points almost equalling their best points tally of 47.

Season review

League
Despite the scare of relegation last season, there were no significant new faces at the Victoria Ground for the 1938–39 season but Frank Soo took over captaincy from Arthur Turner. The fans did not share the club's confidence and their judgement appeared to be justified as the team spent the first three months of the season in the bottom four. Manager Bob McGrory's patience was wearing thin and he started to trim his squad, selling Charlie Scrimshaw to Middlesbrough for £3,000 and veteran Arthur Turner to Birmingham. To strengthen the attack, he recruited Arthur Griffiths and Patrick Gallacher but both players were struck down by injury after a handful of appearances.

New players or not, an amazing transformation took place and had Stoke beaten Leeds on the final day of the season and not drawn, they would have equalled their best points tally of 47. At home in particular they became a potent force and lost just twice at the Victoria Ground during the season.

FA Cup
No progress was made in the Cup as Stoke lost in a third round replay to Leicester City.

Final league table

Results

Stoke's score comes first

Legend

Football League First Division

FA Cup

Squad statistics

References

Stoke City F.C. seasons
Stoke